is a Japanese badminton player, affiliated with the Sanyo Electric team.

Born in Kawagoe, Mie, Ogura started playing badminton at the age of eight. When she was in grade 1 in Shitennoji Senior High School, she entered the Japanese junior team. After graduating from high school in 2002, she joined the Sanyo Electric team.

She partnered with Reiko Shiota, and they became the women's doubles runner-up at the 2005 Asian Championships. The two won their first world grand prix title at the 2005 Denmark Open. In 2006, she won the bronze medal at the Doha 2006 Asian Games, after being defeated by Yang Wei and Zhang Jiewen in the semifinals. She also won the women's doubles bronze at the 2007 World Championships in Kuala Lumpur, Malaysia. In May 2008, she and Shiota ranked 6 in BWF World Ranking, and qualified to compete at the Beijing 2008 Summer Olympics. In the first round they beat the Danish pair Lena Frier Kristiansen and Kamilla Rytter Juhl in the rubber games, but were defeated by Du Jing and Yu Yang of China in the second round in the straight games.

In March 2010, she retired from the Sanyo team, and started to affiliate with Kay Enterprises as a coach.

In March 2011, she married Japanese rugby union player Daisuke Yamamoto, but in September 2012, she submitted a divorce letter.

Achievements

BWF World Championships 
Women's doubles

Asian Games 
Women's doubles

Asian Championships 
Women's doubles

IBF Grand Prix 
The World Badminton Grand Prix has been sanctioned by the International Badminton Federation from 1983 to 2006.

Women's doubles

BWF International Challenge/Series/Satellite 
Women's doubles

  BWF International Challenge tournament
  BWF International Series tournament

References

External links 
 
 

1983 births
Living people
People from Mie Prefecture
Japanese female badminton players
Badminton players at the 2008 Summer Olympics
Olympic badminton players of Japan
Badminton players at the 2006 Asian Games
Asian Games silver medalists for Japan
Asian Games bronze medalists for Japan
Asian Games medalists in badminton
Medalists at the 2006 Asian Games
21st-century Japanese women